Marlborough is a city in Middlesex County, Massachusetts, United States. The population was 41,793 at the 2020 census. Marlborough became a prosperous industrial town in the 19th century and made the transition to high technology industry in the late 20th century after the construction of the Massachusetts Turnpike.

Marlborough was declared a town in 1660. It was incorporated as a city in 1890 when it changed its municipal charter from a New England town meeting system to a mayor–council government.

History

John Howe in 1656 was a fur trader and built a house at the intersection of two Indian trails, Nashua Trail and Connecticut path. He could speak the language of the Algonquian Indians though the local tribe referred to themselves as the Pennacooks. The settlers were welcomed by the Indians because they protected them from other tribes they were at war with. In the 1650s, several families left the nearby town of Sudbury, 18 miles west of Boston, to start a new town. The village was named after Marlborough, the market town in Wiltshire, England. It was first settled in 1657 by 14 men led by Edmund Rice, John Ruddock, John Howe and a third John named John Bent ; in 1656 Rice and his colleagues petitioned the Massachusetts General Court to create the town of Marlborough and it was officially incorporated in 1660. Rice was elected a selectman at Marlborough in 1657. Sumner Chilton Powell wrote, in Puritan Village: The Formation of a New England Town, "Not only did Rice become the largest individual landholder in Sudbury, but he represented his new town in the Massachusetts legislature for five years and devoted at least eleven of his last fifteen years to serving as selectman and judge of small causes."

The Puritan minister Reverend William Brimstead became the first minister of First Church in Marlborough, William Ward the first deacon  and Johnathan Johnson was the first blacksmith.

Marlborough was one of the seven "Praying Indian Towns" because they were converted to Christianity by the Rev. John Eliot of Roxbury. In 1674 a deed was drawn up dividing the land between the settlers and the natives. This is the only record of names of the natives. The settlement was almost destroyed by Native Americans in 1676 during King Philip's War.

In 1711 Marlborough's territory included Northborough, Southborough, Westborough and Hudson. As population, business, and travel grew in the colonies, Marlborough became a favored rest stop on the Boston Post Road. Many travelers stopped at its inns and taverns, including George Washington, who visited the Williams Tavern soon after his inauguration in 1789.

In 1836, Samuel Boyd, known as the "father of the city," and his brother Joseph, opened the first shoe manufacturing business - an act that would change the community forever. By 1890, with a population of 14,000, Marlborough had become a major shoe manufacturing center, producing boots for Union soldiers, as well as footwear for the civilian population. Marlborough became so well known for its shoes that its official seal was decorated with a factory, a shoe box, and a pair of boots when it was incorporated as a city in 1890.

The Civil War resulted in the creation of one of the region's most unusual historical monuments. Legend has it that a company from Marlborough, assigned to Harpers Ferry, appropriated the bell from the firehouse where John Brown last battled for the emancipation of the slaves. The company left the bell in the hands of one Mrs. Elizabeth Snyder for 30 years, returning in 1892 to bring it back to Marlborough. The bell now hangs in a tower at the corner of Route 85 and Main Street.

Around that time, Marlborough is believed to have been the first community in the country to receive a charter for a streetcar system, edging out Baltimore by a few months. The system, designed primarily for passenger use, provided access to Milford to the south, and Concord to the north. As a growing industrialized community, Marlborough began attracting skilled craftsmen from Quebec, Ireland, Italy, and Greece.

Shoe manufacturing continued in Marlborough long after the industry had fled many other New England communities.  Rice & Hutchins, Inc. operated several factories in Marlborough from 1875 to 1929.  Famous Frye boots were manufactured here through the 1970s, and The Rockport Company, founded in Marlborough in 1971, maintained an outlet store in the city until 2017. In 1990, when Marlborough celebrated its centennial as a city, the festivities included the construction of a park in acknowledgment of the shoe industry, featuring statues by the sculptor David Kapenteopolous.

The construction of Interstates 495 and 290 and the Massachusetts Turnpike has enabled the growth of the high technology and specialized electronics industries. With its easy access to major highways and the pro-business, pro-development policies of the city government, the population of Marlborough has increased to over 38,000 at the time of the 2010 census. In November 2016, the administration of Massachusetts Governor Charlie Baker announced a $3 million grant to the city to fund infrastructure improvements along U.S. Route 20 to aid commercial development.

Geography

Marlborough is located at  (42.350909, −71.547530). The Assabet River cuts across the northwest corner of the city. Within city limits are three large lakes, known as Lake Williams, Millham Reservoir and Fort Meadow Reservoir. (A portion of Fort Meadow Reservoir extends into nearby Hudson.)

Marlborough is crossed by Interstate 495, U.S. Route 20 and Massachusetts Route 85. The eastern terminus of Interstate 290 is also in Marlborough.

Adjacent towns

Marlborough is located in eastern Massachusetts, bordered by six municipalities: Berlin, Hudson, Sudbury, Framingham, Southborough, and Northborough.

Demographics

As of the census of 2000, there were 36,255 people, 14,501 households, and 9,280 families residing in the city. The racial makeup of the city was 87.70% White, 2.17% African American, 0.20% Native American, 3.76% Asian, 0.04% Pacific Islander, 3.27% from other races, and 2.86% from two or more races. Hispanic or Latino of any race were 6.06% of the population.

There were 14,501 households, out of which 30.4% had children under the age of 18 living with them, 51.5% were married couples living together, 9.0% had a female householder with no husband present, and 36.0% were non-families. 28.4% of all households were made up of individuals, and 8.3% had someone living alone who was 65 years of age or older. The average household size was 2.47 and the average family size was 3.07.

In the city, the population was spread out, with 23.3% under the age of 18, 7.0% from 18 to 24, 36.7% from 25 to 44, 21.5% from 45 to 64, and 11.6% who were 65 years of age or older. The median age was 36 years. For every 100 females, there were 97.2 males. For every 100 females age 18 and over, there were 94.8 males.

The median income for a household in the city was $56,879, and the median income for a family was $70,385. Males had a median income of $49,133 versus $32,457 for females. The per capita income for the city was $28,723. About 4.7% of families and 6.8% of the population were below the poverty line, including 8.9% of those under age 18 and 10.3% of those age 65 or over.

Economy
Marlborough is home to numerous businesses, stores and restaurants.

Companies from a wide variety of industries with a significant presence in Marlborough include TJX, Raytheon, Hewlett-Packard, AMD, Navilyst Medical, Netezza, Boston Scientific, Sunovion (formerly Sepracor), AT&T, Apple Inc., Egenera, Evergreen Solar, Fidelity Investments, Quest Diagnostics, Lucent Technologies, VCE, Cavium, Hologic, NAPA Auto Parts and the many other businesses large and small that provide the strong business community in the city.

Marlborough Regional Chamber of Commerce
The Marlborough Regional Chamber of Commerce is the local chamber of commerce for Marlborough and five other surrounding towns in MetroWest Massachusetts. The chamber represents the business needs of over 650 businesses and thousands of employees in the area and is headquartered in the city.

The Chamber of Commerce's role has included working with the MetroWest Regional Transit Authority to improve transportation options and to obtain recognition for Marlborough's Downtown Village as a cultural district.

Education

Public schools

High schools (grades 9–12):
Marlborough High School
Assabet Valley Regional Technical High School
Middle school (grades 6–8)
1LT Charles W. Whitcomb School (formerly 4–7 School, Marlborough Middle School, and Marlborough Intermediate Elementary School)
Elementary schools (grades K–5)
Raymond C. Richer Elementary School
Francis J. Kane Elementary School
Sgt. Charles J. Jaworek Elementary School
Goodnow Brothers Elementary School
Preschool (up to Pre-K)
Early Childhood Center

Charter schools

Advanced Advanced Math & Science Academy (grades 6–12)

Parochial schools

Immaculate Conception School (Catholic, PS–8) (closed June 2020)

Private schools

Hillside School (5–9)
Wayside Academy (9–12)
Massachusetts International Academy (closed June 2020)
New England Innovation Academy (6–12)

After school programs

Boys & Girls Clubs of Metrowest

Transportation
Marlborough is located near the intersection of Routes 495, 290, 20 and the Massachusetts Turnpike. It is connected to neighboring towns and cities by MWRTA.

Major highways
Marlborough is served by Two Interstate, one U.S Highway and one state highways:

Mass-transit

Bus
 The MetroWest Regional Transit Authority (MWRTA) operates a regional bus service which provides fixed route public bus lines servicing multiple communities in the MetroWest region, including the towns of Ashland, Framingham, Holliston, Hopkinton, Milford, Marlborough, Sudbury, Sherborn, Natick and Weston.
 MWRTA Routes 7 connect Marlborough with Framingham which is well connected to Boston and other parts of the state via rail and bus.
 MWRTA Route 7C (Inner City Marlborough) line runs roughly east–west through Marlborough. This route runs through the downtown Marlborough and connects multiple Shopping Complexes/Malls, residential localities and Marlborough Hospital. Transfers can be made between routes 7 and 7C at the Marlborough City Hall stop.

Private services
 A number of private Taxi/Limousine services have been listed as being operated in Marlborough e.g. Marlborough City Taxi, American Way, Etc.

Media

Newspapers

Community Advocate, a weekly regional newspaper serving Marlborough and six surrounding communities.

The MetroWest Daily News, a daily newspaper covering Marlborough and surrounding communities in the MetroWest region

The Marlborough Enterprise, the city's weekly newspaper

Marlborough Patch (online daily)

The Main Street Journal, a weekly newspaper.

Television

Channel 8 (Comcast), Channel 34 (Verizon): WMCT-TV Your Community Station (Marlborough Cable Trust).

Channel 96 (Comcast), Channel 33 (Verizon): Marlborough Access, Public Access Television (Marlborough Cable Trust).  

Channel 98:  Marlborough Public Schools' student run station

Arts

Ghost Light Players of MetroWest
Ghost Light Players is a 501(c)(3) charitable organization based in Marlborough. The group has been performing in and around the Marlborough area since 2012, with productions including Hamlet, Dog Sees God, Romeo and Juliet, Macbeth, Godspell, and Love Comics.

Points of interest

 Assabet River Rail Trail
 Brigham Cemetery
 Callahan State Park
 Capt. Peter Rice House
 John Brown Bell
 John J. Carroll Water Treatment Plant
 Lost Shoe Brewing & Roasting Company
 Maplewood Cemetery
 Marlboro Airport (closed)
 Marlborough Center Historic District
 New England Sports Center
 Robin Hill Cemetery
 Rocklawn Cemetery
 Solomon Pond Mall
 Weeks Cemetery
 Wilson Cemetery
 Marlborough Memorial Beach

Notable people

 Horatio Alger, Jr., author, graduated from high school in Marlborough in 1847 (The city's annual Horatio Alger Street Fair was renamed the Harvest Fair in 2007)
 Zach Auguste National Basketball Association player
 Ella A. Bigelow (1849–1917), author and clubwoman
 Walter Brennan, American actor and singer, attended Marlborough High School
 Asa Brigham, politician and businessman
 Carl C. Brigham, psychologist and creator of the SAT Test
 Caroline Brown Buell (1843–1927), activist 
 John Buckley, baseball pitcher
 Mike Burns, Olympian and World Cup soccer player
 Rich Busa, marathon runner
 Bobby Butler, NHL hockey player
 George T. Conway III, lawyer, political commentator; graduated from Marlborough High School in 1980
 Marcia Cross, actress best known for her role in Desperate Housewives; graduated from Marlborough High School in 1980
 Aaron Dalbec, guitarist in bands including Converge and Bane
 Crystal Eastman, lawyer, journalist and activist
 Charles "Duke" Farrell, catcher of the World Series–winning Boston Americans team of 1903
 Heather Fogarty, musician and actress
 Philo C. Fuller, former US Congressman
 Joey Graceffa, actor, author, singer, and YouTube personality
 Gilman Bigelow Howe, genealogist and author
 James Simon Kunen, author of The Strawberry Statement: Notes of a College Revolutionary
 Gregory Maguire, author of Wicked: The Life and Times of the Wicked Witch of the West
 Amory Maynard, industrialist, founder and namesake of Maynard, Massachusetts
 John J. Mitchell, former U.S. Congressman
 Robert J. Murray, Under Secretary of the Navy
 Roy Nutt, businessman and computer pioneer
 George Pyne II, American football player
 Ken Reynolds, Major League Baseball player
 Jim Reynolds, Major League Baseball umpire
 Edmund Rice, co-founder and early resident
 Franklin Pierce Rice, printer, publisher and antiquarian
 Henry Rice, Massachusetts state legislator and subject of Gilbert Stuart portrait
 John Rock, gynecologist and obstetrician, co-credited with developing the first effective oral contraceptive
 Canaan Severin, American football wide receiver
 Bill Simmons, sports personality
 Lucy Goodale Thurston, missionary
 John Patrick Treacy, Roman Catholic Bishop of the Diocese of La Crosse
 Bobb Trimble, musician
 Paul Warnke, diplomat
 Katya Zamolodchikova, drag queen

Sister cities and towns
Cities
 – Akiruno, Tokyo, Japan from November 3, 1998
 – Ipatinga, Minas Gerais, Brazil from June, 2009
Towns
 – Marlborough, Wiltshire, England, United Kingdom from 1657

See also
 Marlborough Country Club
 National Register of Historic Places listings in Marlborough, Massachusetts

References

Further reading
 1871 Atlas of Massachusetts. by Wall & Gray.Map of Massachusetts. Map of Middlesex County.
 History of the Town of Marlborough, Middlesex County, Massachusetts. by Charles Hudson, and Joseph Allen. Published 1862, 544 pages.
 History of Middlesex County, Massachusetts, Volume 1 (A-H), Volume 2 (L-W) compiled by Samuel Adams Drake, published 1879 and 1880. 572 and 505 pages. Marlborough Section in Volume 2 page 137 by R. A. Griffin and E. L. Bigelow.

External links

 City of Marlborough, Massachusetts
 Marlborough Historical Society
 Marlborough Regional Chamber of Commerce

 
Populated places established in 1657
1657 establishments in Massachusetts
Cities in Massachusetts
Cities in Middlesex County, Massachusetts